is a Japanese professional wrestler currently working for the Japanese professional wrestling promotion Ice Ribbon where she is one half of the International Ribbon Tag Team Champions.

Professional wrestling career

Independent circuit (2010–present)
Kurumi is known for her activity in various professional wrestling promotions other than Ice Ribbon. At the WAVE Summer Fiesta '16 of Pro Wrestling Wave, she teamed up with Tsukushi, falling short to Ryo Mizunami and Misaki Ohata. At a house show hosted by JWP Joshi Puroresu on January 29, 2017, Kurumi teamed up with Megumi Yabushita and defeated Kazuki and Rydeen Hagane in a judo rules tag team match. While working in Seadlinnng, she participated at SEAdLINNNG Fortissimo from May 24, 2017, where she teamed up with Sareee to defeat Rin Kadokura and Takumi Iroha. Kurumi also worked for Oz Academy, and at OZ Academy Autumn Festival on October 4, 2020, she teamed up with Tsubasa Kuragaki and unsuccessfully faced MISSION K4 (Kaho Kobayashi and Kakeru Sekiguchi) in no.1 contendership tournament semi-final for the OZ Academy Tag Team Championship. At OZ Academy Plum Hanasaku on August 28, 2020, she teamed up with Asuka and picked up a victory over Itsuki Aoki and Rina Yamashita in a tag team match. An important event where she participated was the OZ Academy Sonoko Kato 25th Anniversary from July 12, 2020, which portraited 25 years of Sonoko Kato's career, where she teamed up with Tsubasa Kuragaki to face Kato herself and Mika Akino.

Ice Ribbon (2010–2021)
Kurumi made her professional wrestling debut at the early age of 10, working her first match for Ice Ribbon, at New Ice Ribbon #149 from January 16, 2010, where she fell short to Chii Tomiya. She became one of the youngest champions in professional wrestling history after she defeated Tsukushi at 19 O'Clock Girls Pro Wrestling 87 on September 16, 2011 at the age of 11 to win the vacant IW19 Championship. At RibbonMania 2019, an event which portraited the retirement of Tequila Saya, Kurumi participated in a 38-person gauntlet match, competing against notable opponents such as Ken Ohka, Munenori Sawa, Manami Toyota, Syuri and others. At Ice Ribbon Vs. Shinjuku 2-chome, an event produced by Ice Ribbon in partnership with 666 Wrestling on November 8, 2020, Kurumi participated in a 18-man battle royal also involving Masashi Takeda, Shinobu Sugawara and Asukama, and on the same night, she unsuccessfully challenged Ram Kaicho and Koju Takeda for the Triangle Ribbon Championship in a three-way match. At Ice Ribbon Risa Sera's 5th Produced Show from October 24, 2020, Kurumi participated in a Ironwoman hardcore match for the FantastICE Championship also involving the champion Risa Sera and Suzu Suzuki and a few male participants such as Minoru Fujita, Yuko Miyamoto, Takashi Sasaki and Takayuki Ueki.

World Wonder Ring Stardom (2022–present)
Kurumi aligned herself with Suzu Suzuki, Risa Sera, Akane Fujita & Mochi Miyagi in the Prominence stable at the end of 2021 after their contract with Ice Ribbon expired, leaving them to wander as freelance wrestlers.  Kurumi and the rest of the stable made their first appearance in World Wonder Ring Stardom's first pay-per-view of 2022, the Stardom Nagoya Supreme Fight from January 29 where they picked a fight with the Donna Del Mondo stable. At Mid Summer Champions in Nagoya, the second event of the Stardom Mid Summer Champions series which took place on July 24, 2022, Kurumi teamed up with Suzuki and Risa Sera to defeat Cosmic Angels (Mina Shirakawa, Unagi Sayaka and Hikari Shimizu) and Queen's Quest (Lady C, Hina and Miyu Amasaki). At Stardom Dream Queendom 2 on December 29, 2022, Suzuki teamed up with Suzu Suzuki and Risa Sera and defeated Oedo Tai (Starlight Kid, Momo Watanabe and Saki Kashima) to win the Artist of Stardom Championship.

At the 2023 edition of the Triangle Derby, Kurumi will team up with Suzuki and Sera and compete in the "Triangle Blue" where they will face the teams of Rebel&Enemy (Ram Kaicho, Maika Ozaki and Maya Yukihi), Lollipop (Waka Tsukiyama, Yuko Sakurai and Rina Amikura),  Classmates (Hazuki, Koguma and Saya Iida), MaiHime with C (Maika, Himeka and Lady C), Abarenbo GE (Syuri, Mirai and Ami Sourei), and Oedo Tai (Natsuko Tora, Momo Watanabe and Saki Kashima).

Championships and accomplishments
Ice Ribbon
ICE×∞ Championship (2 times)
IW19 Championship (2 times)
International Ribbon Tag Team Championship (6 times) - with Tsukushi (4), Mochi Miyagi (1), and Hiroyo Matsumoto (1)
Sozei Pro Tag Team Championshuip (1 time) – with Maruko Nagasaki
Ice Ribbon Year-End Award (1 time)
Best Tag Team Award (2020) – 
World Wonder Ring Stardom
Artist of Stardom Championship (1 time, current) – Suzu Suzuki and Risa Sera

References 

2000 births
Living people
Sportspeople from Tokyo
Japanese female professional wrestlers
21st-century professional wrestlers
Artist of Stardom Champions